The 1927 Cincinnati Reds season was a season in American baseball. The team finished fifth in the National League with a record of 75–78, 18½ games behind the Pittsburgh Pirates.

Off-season 
On February 9, 1927, the Reds traded long time outfielder Edd Roush to the New York Giants in exchange for infielder High Pockets Kelly. Roush, who was acquired by the Reds from the Giants in 1916, hit .336 with 46 HR and 722 RBI while adding 197 stolen bases in 1298 games with Cincinnati from 1916-1926. Kelly, who had played with the Giants since 1915, led the National League in home runs in 1921, and was the league leader in RBI in 1920 and 1924. In 1136 games with New York, Kelly batted .301 with 123 HR and 762 RBI.

Long-time owner Garry Herrmann, who bought the Reds in 1902, sold the team to C. J. McDiarmid. Under Hermann's ownership, the Reds won the 1919 World Series.

Regular season 
The Reds got off to a very poor start in 1927, going 11-25 in their first 36 games and quickly found themselves in last place in the National League. On July 12, the Reds remained in the National League cellar with a 28-50 through their first 78 games, however, a 21-6 streak in their next 27 games saw the club vault into fifth place in the league with a 49-56 record.

Cincinnati got within one game of a .500 record, as on September 24, following a 1-0 win over the Brooklyn Robins, the Reds had a 72-73 record. That would be the closest the team would get to .500, as they finished the season with a 75-78 record, finishing 18.5 games behind the NL Pennant winning Pittsburgh Pirates.

This marked the first season since 1921 that the Reds finished with a losing record. The 75 wins was the fewest by Cincinnati since they finished 70-83 in 1921.

Catcher Bubbles Hargrave led Cincinnati with a .308 batting average, and had 35 RBI in 102 games. Outfielder Curt Walker batted .292 with a team high six home runs and 80 RBI in 30 games. Rookie outfielder Ethan Allen hit .295 with two home runs and 20 RBI, and had a team high 12 stolen bases in 111 games. High Pockets Kelly suffered through an injury plagued season, hitting .270 with five home runs and 21 RBI in 61 games.

Red Lucas led the Reds pitching staff, as he finished with an 18-11 record, leading the team in wins, as well as a team high 239.2 innings in 37 games. Carl Mays had a solid season, earning a 15-12 record with a 3.51 ERA and a team high 121 strikeouts in 44 games. Pete Donohue struggled to a 6-16 record with a 4.11 ERA in 33 games after two consecutive 20+ win seasons.

Season standings

Record vs. opponents

Roster

Player stats

Batting

Starters by position 
Note: Pos = Position; G = Games played; AB = At bats; H = Hits; Avg. = Batting average; HR = Home runs; RBI = Runs batted in

Other batters 
Note: G = Games played; AB = At bats; H = Hits; Avg. = Batting average; HR = Home runs; RBI = Runs batted in

Pitching

Starting pitchers 
Note: G = Games pitched; IP = Innings pitched; W = Wins; L = Losses; ERA = Earned run average; SO = Strikeouts

Other pitchers 
Note: G = Games pitched; IP = Innings pitched; W = Wins; L = Losses; ERA = Earned run average; SO = Strikeouts

References 
1927 Cincinnati Reds season at Baseball Reference

Cincinnati Reds seasons
Cincinnati Reds season
Cincinnati Reds